Kristensen is a surname of Danish origin. People with the surname include:

 Thomas Kristensen, a Danish footballer
 Erik S. Kristensen,  a Lieutenant commander of the United States Navy SEALs
 Rasmus Nissen Kristensen,  a Danish professional footballer 
 Tom Kristensen (racing driver),  a Danish former racing driver
 Knud Kristensen, a Prime Minister of Denmark
 Caryl Kristensen, an American comedian 
 Patrick Kristensen, a Danish footballer

See also
 Kristensen Rocks, twin rocks in the Possession Islands group in the Ross Sea, Antarctica
 Kristensen Cabinet, government of Denmark under Knud Kristensen from November 7, 1945, to November 13, 1947
 Christensen (surname)
 Christiansen
 Christianson
 Kristiansen
Surnames from given names